Meldonium (INN; trade name Mildronate, among others) is a limited-market pharmaceutical, developed in 1970 by Ivars Kalviņš at the USSR Latvia Institute of Organic Synthesis, and now manufactured by the Latvian pharmaceutical company Grindeks and several generic manufacturers. It is primarily distributed in Eastern European countries as an anti-ischemia medication.

Since 1 January 2016, it has been on the World Anti-Doping Agency (WADA) list of substances banned from use by athletes. Meldonium can be used as a metabolic modulator, changing how some hormones accelerate or slow down enzymatic reactions in the body. However, there are debates over its use as an athletic performance enhancer. Some athletes are known to have used meldonium before it was banned. Nevertheless, many athletes have been suspended or disqualified officially in relation to this drug.

Medical use
Meldonium may be used to treat coronary artery disease. These heart problems may sometimes lead to ischemia, a condition where too little blood flows to the organs in the body, especially the heart. Because this drug is thought to expand the arteries, it helps to increase the blood flow as well as increase the flow of oxygen throughout the body. Meldonium has also been found to induce anticonvulsant and antihypnotic effects involving alpha 2-adrenergic receptors, as well as nitric oxide-dependent mechanisms.  This, in summary, shows that meldonium given in acute doses could be beneficial for the treatment of seizures and alcohol intoxication. It is also used in cases of cerebral ischemia, ocular ischemic syndrome and other ocular disease caused by disturbed arterial circulation and may also have some effect on decreasing the severity of withdrawal symptoms caused by the cessation of chronic alcohol use. It can also be used when there are cases of acute and chronic ischemic brain blood circulation disorders, reduced working capacity, physical and psycho-emotional overload as well as during the recovery period after cerebrovascular disorders, head injury and encephalitis.

Physio-pharmacology 

To ensure a continuous guarantee of energy supply, the cell's energy-producing mitochondria oxidise considerable amounts of fat along with glucose. Carnitine transports long-chain fatty acids (FA) from the cytosol of the cell into the mitochondrion and is therefore essential for fatty acid oxidation (known as beta oxidation). Carnitine is mainly absorbed from the diet, but can be formed through biosynthesis. To produce carnitine, lysine residues are methylated to trimethyllysine. Four enzymes are involved in the conversion of trimethyllysine and its intermediate forms into the final product of carnitine. The last of these 4 enzymes is gamma-butyrobetaine dioxygenase (GBB), which hydroxylates butyrobetaine into carnitine.

The main cardioprotective effects of meldonium are mediated by the inhibition of GBB. By subsequently inhibiting carnitine biosynthesis, fatty acid transport is reduced and the accumulation of cytotoxic intermediate products of fatty acid beta-oxidation in ischemic tissues to produce energy is prevented, therefore blocking this highly oxygen-consuming process. Treatment with meldonium therefore shifts the myocardial energy metabolism from fatty acid oxidation to the more favorable oxidation of glucose, or glycolysis, under conditions where oxygen is limited. It also reduces the formation of trimethylamine N-oxide (TMAO), a product of carnitine breakdown that has been implicated in the pathogenesis of atherosclerosis and congestive heart failure.
 In fatty acid (FA) metabolism, long chain fatty acids in the cytosol cannot cross the mitochondrial membrane because they are negatively charged. The process in which they move into the mitochondria is called the carnitine shuttle. Long chain FA are first activated via esterification with coenzyme A to produce a fatty acid-coA complex which can then cross the external mitochondrial border. The co-A is then exchanged with carnitine (via the enzyme carnitine palmitoyltransferase I) to produce a fatty acid-carnitine complex. This complex is then transported through the inner mitochondrial membrane via a transporter protein called carnitine-acylcarnitine translocase. Once inside, carnitine is liberated (catalysed by the enzyme carnitine palmitoyltransferase II) and transported back outside so the process can occur again. Acylcarnitines like palmitoylcarnitine are produced as intermediate products of the carnitine shuttle.

In the mitochondria themselves, meldonium also competitively inhibits the carnitine shuttle protein SLC22A5. This results in reduced transportation and metabolism of long-chain fatty acids in the mitochondria (this burden is shifted more to peroxisomes). The final effect is a decreased risk of mitochondrial injury from fatty acid oxidation and a reduction of the production of acylcarnitines, which has been implicated in the development of insulin resistance. Because of its inhibitory effects on L-carnitine biosynthesis and its subsequent glycolytic effects as well as reduced acylcarnitine production, meldonium has been indicated for use in diabetic patients. In animal models and a very small clinical trial, meldonium has been shown to reduce blood glucose concentrations, exhibit cardioprotective effects and prevent or reduce the severity of diabetic complications. Long-term treatment has also been shown to attenuate the development of atherosclerosis in the heart.

Meldonium's vasodilatory effects are thought to be due to the stimulation of the production of nitric oxide in the vascular endothelium. It is hypothesized that meldonium may increase the formation of the gamma-butyrobetaine esters, which are potent parasympathomimetics, and may activate the endothelial NOS (eNOS) enzyme, which causes nitric oxide production via stimulation of the M3 muscarinic acetylcholine receptor or specific gamma-butyrobetaine ester receptors.

Meldonium is believed to continually train the heart pharmacologically, even without physical activity, inducing preparation of cellular metabolism and membrane structures (specifically in myocardial mitochondria) to survive ischemic stress conditions. This is done by adapting myocardial cells to lower fatty acid inflow and by activating glycolysis; the heart eventually begins using glycolysis instead of beta oxidation during real life ischaemic conditions. This reduces oxidative stress on cells, formation of cytotoxic products of fatty acid oxidation and subsequent cellular damage. This has made meldonium a possible pharmacological agent for ischemic preconditioning.

The mechanisms underlying the central nervous system effects of meldonium are unclear. In a study in a transgenic mouse model of Alzheimer's disease, meldonium increased cognition and mental performance by reducing amyloid beta deposition in the hippocampus.

Pharmacology

The mechanism of action of meldonium is to act as a fatty acid oxidation inhibitor, presumably by inhibiting enzymes in the carnitine biosynthesis pathway such as γ-butyrobetaine hydroxylase. Although initial reports suggested meldonium is a non-competitive and non-hydroxylatable analogue of gamma-butyrobetaine; further studies have identified that meldonium is a substrate for gamma-butyrobetaine dioxygenase. X-ray crystallographic and in vitro biochemical studies suggest that meldonium binds to the substrate pocket of γ-butyrobetaine hydroxylase and acts as an alternative substrate, and therefore a competitive inhibitor. Normally, this enzyme's action on its substrates γ-butyrobetaine and 2-oxoglutarate gives, in the presence of the further substrate oxygen, the products L-carnitine, succinate, and carbon dioxide; in the presence of this alternate substrate, the reaction yields malonic acid semialdehyde, formaldehyde (akin to the action of histone demethylases), dimethylamine, and (1-methylimidazolidin-4-yl)acetic acid, "an unexpected product with an additional carbon-carbon bond resulting from N-demethylation coupled to oxidative rearrangement, likely via an unusual radical mechanism." The unusual mechanism is thought likely to involve a Steven's type rearrangement.

Meldonium's inhibition of γ-butyrobetaine hydroxylase gives a half maximal inhibitory concentration (IC50) value of 62 micromolar, which other study authors have described as "potent." Meldonium is an example of an inhibitor that acts as a non-peptidyl substrate mimic.

Meldonium has also been shown by NMR to bind to carnitine acetyltransferase. Carnitine acetyltransferase belongs to a family of ubiquitous enzymes that play pivotal roles in cellular energy metabolism. Meldonium is a relatively weak inhibitor to carnitine acetyltransferase (when compared to γ-butyrobetaine hydroxylase), with an inhibition constant (KI) of 1.6 mM.

Chemistry 
The chemical name of meldonium is 3-(2,2,2-trimethylhydraziniumyl) propionate. It is a structural analogue of γ-butyrobetaine, with an amino group replacing the C-4 methylene of γ-butyrobetaine. γ-Butyrobetaine is a precursor in the biosynthesis of carnitine.

Society and culture

Doping
Meldonium was added to the World Anti-Doping Agency (WADA) list of banned substances effective 1 January 2016 because of evidence of its use by athletes with the intention of enhancing performance. It was on the 2015 WADA's list of drugs to be monitored. A high prevalence of meldonium use by athletes in sport was demonstrated by the laboratory findings at the Baku 2015 European Games. 13 medallists or competition winners were taking meldonium at the time of the Baku Games. Meldonium use was detected in athletes competing in 15 of the 21 sports during the Games. Most of the athletes taking meldonium withheld the information of their use from anti-doping authorities by not declaring it on their doping control forms as they should have. Only 23 of the 662 (3.5%) athletes tested declared the personal use of meldonium. However, 66 of the total 762 (8.7%) of athlete urine samples analysed during the Games and during pre-competition tested positive for meldonium.

WADA classes the drug as a metabolic modulator, just as it does insulin. Metabolic modulators are classified as S4 substances according to the WADA banned substances list. These substances have the ability to modify how some hormones accelerate or slow down different enzymatic reactions in the body. In this way, these modulators can block the body's conversion of testosterone into oestrogen, which is necessary for females. On 13 April 2016 it was reported that WADA had issued updated guidelines allowing less than 1 microgram per milliliter of meldonium for tests done before 1 March 2016. The agency cited that "preliminary tests showed that it could take weeks or months for the drug to leave the body".

Affected athletes
On 7 March 2016, former world number one tennis player Maria Sharapova announced that she had failed a drug test in Australia due to the detection of meldonium. She said that she had been taking the drug for ten years for various health issues, and had not noticed that it had been banned. On 8 June 2016, she was suspended from playing tennis for two years by the International Tennis Federation (ITF), which was reduced to 15 months by Court of Arbitration for Sport after appeal. Earlier the same year (March 7), Russian ice dancer Ekaterina Bobrova announced that she had also tested positive for meldonium at the 2016 European Figure Skating Championships. Bobrova said she was shocked about the test result, because she had been made aware of meldonium's addition to the banned list, and had been careful to avoid products containing banned substances. In May 2016, Russian professional boxer Alexander Povetkin—a former two-time World Boxing Association (WBA) Heavyweight Champion—tested positive for meldonium. This was discovered just a week prior to his mandatory title match against World Boxing Council (WBC) Heavyweight Champion, Deontay Wilder. As a result, the match—scheduled to take place in Russia—was postponed indefinitely by the WBC.

Other athletes who are provisionally banned for using meldonium include UFC flyweight Liliya Shakirova, Ethiopian-Swedish middle-distance runner Abeba Aregawi, Ethiopian long-distance runner Endeshaw Negesse, Russian cyclist Eduard Vorganov, and Ukrainian biathletes Olga Abramova and Artem Tyshchenko.

The Ice Hockey Federation of Russia replaced the Russia men's national under-18 ice hockey team with an under-17 team for the 2016 IIHF World U18 Championships after players on the original roster tested positive for meldonium.

More than 170 failed tests by athletes were identified in a relatively brief period after the ban on meldonium was imposed on 1 January 2016, almost all of which were from Eastern European countries. Many of the early cases were dropped when athletes claimed that they had ceased use in 2015. Notable athletes with positive samples include:

In addition it was reported that five Georgian wrestlers and a German wrestler had tested positive for the drug although no further names were released. On 25 March 2016 the Fédération Internationale de Sambo confirmed that four wrestlers under their governance (two from Russia and two from other countries) had recorded positive tests for the drug.

Debates 

A December 2015 study in the journal Drug Testing and Analysis argued that meldonium "demonstrates an increase in endurance performance of athletes, improved rehabilitation after exercise, protection against stress, and enhanced activation of central nervous system (CNS) functions". However the study itself presents no evidence for this claim, and focuses instead on describing two approaches for the reliable identification of meldonium.

The manufacturer, Grindeks, said in a statement that it did not believe meldonium's use should be banned for athletes. It said the drug worked mainly by reducing damage to cells that can be caused by certain byproducts of carnitine. Meldonium "is used to prevent death of ischemic cells and not to increase performance of normal cells", the statement said. "Meldonium cannot improve athletic performance, but it can stop tissue damage in the case of ischemia", the lack of blood flow to an area of the body.

The drug was invented in the mid-1970s at the Institute of Organic Synthesis of the Latvian SSR Academy of Sciences by Ivars Kalviņš. Kalviņš criticized the ban, saying that WADA had not presented scientific proof that the drug can be used for doping. According to him, meldonium does not enhance athletic performance in any way, and was rather used by athletes to prevent damage to the heart and muscles caused by lack of oxygen during high-intensity exercise. He contended that not allowing athletes to take care of their health was a violation of their human rights, and that the decision aimed to remove Eastern European athletes from competitions and his drug from the pharmaceutical market. Liene Kozlovska, the former head of the anti-doping department of the Latvian sports medicine center, rejected claims that the ban is in violation of athletes' rights, saying that meldonium is dangerous in high doses, and should only be used under medical supervision to treat genuine health conditions. She also speculated that Russian athletes may not have received adequate warnings that the drug was banned – due to the suspension of the Russian Anti-Doping Agency in late 2015.

Forbes reported that anesthesiology professor Michael Joyner, at the Mayo Clinic in Rochester, Minnesota, who studies how humans respond to physical and mental stress during exercise and other activities, told them that "Evidence is lacking for many compounds believed to enhance athletic performance. Its use has a sort of urban legend element and there is not much out there that it is clearly that effective. I would be shocked if this stuff [meldonium] had an effect greater than caffeine or creatine (a natural substance that, when taken as a supplement, is thought to enhance muscle mass)." Ford Vox, a U.S.-based physician specializing in rehabilitation medicine and a journalist reported "there's not much scientific support for its use as an athletic enhancer".

Don Catlin, a long-time anti-doping expert and the scientific director of the Banned Substances Control Group (BSCG) said "There's really no evidence that there's any performance enhancement from meldonium – Zero percent".

Approval status
Meldonium, which is not approved by the FDA in the United States, is registered and prescribed in Latvia, Russia, Ukraine, Georgia, Kazakhstan, Azerbaijan, Belarus, Uzbekistan, Moldova, Lithuania, Albania, and Kyrgyzstan.

Economics
Meldonium is manufactured by Grindeks, a Latvian pharmaceutical company, with offices in thirteen Eastern European countries as a treatment for heart conditions. The company identifies it as one of their main products. It had sales of 65 million euros in 2013.

References

Antianginals
Doping in sport
Drugs acting on the cardiovascular system
Drugs in the Soviet Union
Hydrazines
Ischemic heart diseases
Latvian inventions
Quaternary ammonium compounds
Soviet inventions
Zwitterions
World Anti-Doping Agency prohibited substances
Doping in Russia
Drugs in sport